Aaron Agassi is a Filipino actor and singer.

Personal life 
Agassi's older brothers are actors Carlos Agassi and Michael Agassi.

Agassi is a Christian.

Filmography

Television

Discography

Studio albums

As featured artist

Guest appearances

Awards and nominations

References

External links 
 

Living people
Star Magic personalities
1988 births